Peacocking is when a male uses ostentatious clothing and behavior to attract a female and to stand out from other competing males, with the intention to become more memorable and interesting. Peacocking is very common among men, and it can happen either consciously or subconsciously. Peacocking happens subconsciously especially when a desirable female suddenly comes into sight. Prevalence of peacocking strongly correlates with woman's level of attractiveness.

According to some feminist scholars men may tend to peacock because of the patriarchal ideas created by society. This hierarchy created between men and women and this idea of men competing for women's attention leads to peacocking.

References

External links
A Gentleman's Guide to Peacocking

Seduction